Blac Monks was an American southern hip hop group from Houston, Texas, consisting of 3-2, D.A. and Awol. In 1994, they released their debut album Secrets of the Hidden Temple via Rap-A-Lot Records, which also featured Quiet Storm (Assata Tafari) on the single "Buddha Nature". Assata and Raheem joined the group to release their sophomore album No Mercy.

Discography

Studio albums

See also
Houston hip hop

References

External links
 Black Monks discography at Discogs

African-American musical groups
Musical groups from Houston
Musical groups established in 1993
Musical groups disestablished in 1998
Rappers from Houston
American musical trios